Jordon Benjamin Crawford (born July 17, 1990) is an American professional basketball player for ONVO Büyükçekmece of the Turkish Basketball Super League (BSL). He played college basketball for Bowling Green.

High school career
Crawford attended La Salle High School, who he led to a 23–3 record as a senior, including a 9–1 mark in the Greater Catholic League (GCL). Crawford, a team captain, was named conference player of the year, defensive player of the year, and first team all-league. Additionally, he was named first team all-district and all-city.

College career
After graduating from high school, Crawford played for Bowling Green where he was an All-MAC conference player as a senior after averaging 15 points, 4 assist, 3 rebounds and 2 steals per game. He finished with a rank of 4th in school history in assists with 473, 5th in school history in steals with 184, and 23rd in scoring.

Professional career
In September 2014, Crawford signed with the Halifax Rainmen of the Canadian NBL, but later left the team before appearing in a game for them. Crawford's first professional gig came in December 2014 when he signed with Mapfree Life of Cyprus' North League. He had a strong season for the club, averaging 26.8 points, 6.3 assists, 4.2 rebounds and 2.5 steals per game and led his team to the North League title where he was named the North League Playoffs Most Valuable Player. He was also named to the All-Star Team and played in the league's All-Star Game. With his 26.8 points per game, Crawford led the league in scoring and won the Scoring Title.

On October 31, 2015, Crawford was selected in the fifth round of the 2015 NBA Development League Draft by the Westchester Knicks.

On February 11, 2017, Crawford was traded to the Canton Charge in exchange for Canton's 2017 second round pick and the Sioux Falls Skyforce's third round pick. Three days later, he made his debut in a 120–109 win over the Fort Wayne Mad Ants, recording three points, one rebound and one assist in 16 minutes off the bench.

On January 25, 2018, he signed with Macedonian club MZT Skopje for the rest of the 2017–18 season.

On September 4, 2019, he has signed with Afyon Belediye of the Turkish Basketbol Süper Ligi.

On November 25, 2020, he has signed with Élan Chalon of LNB Pro A. Crawford averaged 12 points and 6 assists per game in the LNB Pro A. On July 18, 2021, he signed with Büyükçekmece of the Turkish Basketball Super League (BSL).

The Basketball Tournament (TBT) (2017–present) 
In the summer of 2017, Crawford played in The Basketball Tournament on ESPN for Team Fredette. He competed for the $2 million prize, and for Team Fredette, he scored 19 points and grabbed 6 rebounds in their first-round game, which they lost to Team Utah (Utah Alumni) 100–97.

Personal life
The son of Donald and Kelle Crawford, he has a daughter named Alaynah and his wife is Tiffany Crawford. Crawford majored in sports management at Bowling Green.

References

External links
 
 Bowling Green bio
 RealGM profile

1990 births
Living people
Afyonkarahisar Belediyespor players
American expatriate basketball people in Cyprus
American expatriate basketball people in Germany
American expatriate basketball people in Mexico
American expatriate basketball people in North Macedonia
American men's basketball players
Basketball players from Cincinnati
Bowling Green Falcons men's basketball players
Büyükçekmece Basketbol players
Canton Charge players
KK MZT Skopje players
Memphis Hustle players
Riesen Ludwigsburg players
Shooting guards
Westchester Knicks players